Blackie the Pirate is a 1971 comedy film with Terence Hill and Bud Spencer, unusual in that the popular team has little screen time together.

Story
Captain Blackie (Terence Hill) is a notorious pirate who learns about a shipment of Spanish gold when he encounters Don Pedro (George Martin). He devises a plan to find this ship and its gold. His rival is the Viceroy of the Spanish colony.

He goes to Tortuga (a pirate settlement), where Montbarc, DeLussac, and Skull (Bud Spencer), three other pirate captains, all have different versions of the events involving the gold; Montbarc sells two prisoners from his capture of a Spanish frigate. Don Pedro recognizes the wife of the Viceroy, and Blackie buys her. However, Skull also knows who she is, and tries to make a deal. Blackie refuses, and Skull makes a deal with the other two pirate captains to plot against Blackie. Blackie manages to elude and escape the other three and makes it to the San Luis, where he finds a secret about the gold. When he returns to his ship, it has been captured by the other three pirates where they plan to use it for their plan. Skull takes them as prisoners where he still demands to make a deal or torture them for information.

Blackie manages to free his crew, but loses his ship the "Fury". Skull is his prisoner, and he uses now Skull's ship the "Erebus" to get the gold.

Cast 
 Terence Hill as Blackie
 Silvia Monti as Isabel
 George Martin as Pedro
 Diana Lorys as Manuela
 Mónica Randall as Carmen 
 Sal Borgese as Martin
 Pasquale Basile as Stiller 
 Fernando Bilbao as Moko 
 Bud Spencer as Skull
 Aldo Cecconi as Recruiter
 Paolo Magalotti as Alonso
 Gustavo Re as Noble
 Luciano Pigozzi as Montbarque 
 Carlo Reali as DeLussac

Production
Filming for this film took place shortly after the filming for They Call Me Trinity (1970) ended and before that movie was released and it became known how successful that movie, and its formula, would become. Shortly after filming for Blackie the Pirate (1971) was finished, the production for Trinity Is Still My Name (1971) started.
The depiction of the sea battles was achieved by using stock footage.

Biography

References

External links
 

1971 films
1970s historical adventure films
Italian adventure comedy films
Italian historical adventure films
1970s Italian-language films
Spanish adventure comedy films
Pirate films
Films set in the 17th century
Terence Hill and Bud Spencer
Films shot in Lazio
1970s adventure comedy films
1971 comedy films
1970s Italian films